Bayramiç is a town in Çanakkale Province in the Marmara Region of Turkey. It is the seat of Bayramiç District. Its population is 15,760 (2021).

References

External links
 Road map of Bayramiç and environs
 Various images of Bayramiç, Çanakkale

Populated places in Çanakkale Province
Bayramiç District
Towns in Turkey